Osík is a municipality and village in Svitavy District in the Pardubice Region of the Czech Republic. It has about 1,000 inhabitants.

Notable people
Mario Korbel (1882–1954), Czech-American sculptor
Ludmila Jandová (1938–2008), painter

References

Villages in Svitavy District